Jenkins Township may refer to the following townships in the United States:

Jenkins Township, Mitchell County, Iowa
 Jenkins Township, Crow Wing County, Minnesota
 Jenkins Township, Barry County, Missouri
 Jenkins Township, Luzerne County, Pennsylvania